Dedan is a village and former non-salute princely state on Saurashtra peninsula in Gujarat, western India.

History 
The Fifth Class princely state, in Sorath prant, was ruled by Baberia Kotila kathi Chieftains.

In 1901 it comprised the town and eleven other villages, covering 50 square miles, with a combined population of 4,394, yielding 59,405 Rupees state revenue (1903-4, about half from land), paying 4,181 tribute to the Gaikwar Baroda State und Unamamuli (1225).

References

External links and Sources 
History
 Imperial Gazetteer, on DSAL.UChicago.edu - Kathiawar

Princely states of Gujarat
Kathi princely states
Villages in Amreli district
The king of Dedan state was Danta bapu Kotila who was the great king.